Love Songs is a compilation album that comprises love songs recorded by the Beatles between 1962 and 1970. It was released by Capitol Records in the United States on 21 October 1977 (catalogue number SKBL-11711) and on Parlophone in the United Kingdom on 19 November 1977 (PCSP 721). The compilation peaked at #24 in Billboard's Top LPs & Tape chart during a 31-week stay that began on 12 November 1977. The RIAA certified the album with sales of three million units in 2000 even though the compilation was deleted in the late 1980s.
The New Zealand release followed the US release with cat. no. and pressing plates, and was released on 2 different EMI labels.

The LP's original packaging included an 11 x 11" booklet, with the songs' lyrics printed, calligraphy-style, on simulated parchment paper.  For the first several pressings, the cover itself was simulated leather, and the Beatles' image (a re-working of Richard Avedon's 1967 portrait, featured in Look Magazine) was simulated gold-foil.  The LP was also available on yellow vinyl.

As with the previous year's Rock 'n' Roll Music compilation, the songs were presented with the left and right channels reversed, with the four Rubber Soul tracks - "Girl", "In My Life", "Michelle", and "Norwegian Wood (This Bird Has Flown)" - appearing in slightly narrowed stereo. Three further tracks—"Yes It Is", "This Boy", and "P.S. I Love You"—used the Duophonic mixes.

Track listing
All tracks written by John Lennon and Paul McCartney except where noted.

Cancelled single
Capitol Records originally intended to release a single in promotion of the compilation. The song "Girl" was going to be backed with "You're Going to Lose That Girl" as Capitol 4506. Picture sleeves for the single were printed, but the record was cancelled in early October 1977.

Charts and certifications

Charts

Certifications

Notes

References

External links
Love Songs at Graham Calkin's Beatles Pages

The Beatles compilation albums
Albums produced by George Martin
Albums produced by Phil Spector
1977 compilation albums
Parlophone compilation albums
Capitol Records compilation albums
Albums arranged by George Martin
Albums recorded at Apple Studios
Albums recorded at Olympic Sound Studios